The Guiberson House is a historic residence located in Winterset, Iowa, United States.  Edwin R. Guiberson settled in Winterset in the late 1840s, and worked as a lot agent selling property after the town was platted.  He also served a term as County Judge.  Calib Clark, a local stonemason, is credited with building this house from 1861 to 1865. The two-story structure is composed of locally quarried limestone that is laid in a random ashlar pattern.  The five bay facade features entry ways in the second and fourth bays.  The house was listed on the National Register of Historic Places in 1979.

References 

Houses completed in 1865
Vernacular architecture in Iowa
Houses in Winterset, Iowa
National Register of Historic Places in Madison County, Iowa
Houses on the National Register of Historic Places in Iowa
1865 establishments in Iowa